Speranța Nisporeni is a Moldovan football club based in Nisporeni, Moldova.

The club was founded in 1991 and played 6 seasons in the Moldovan National Division between 1992 and 1998, before being relegated to the Moldovan "A" Division. They were promoted back into the Moldovan National Division in the 2015–16 season.

Achievements
Divizia B
 Winners (1): 2013–14

European record

As of 18 July 2019

Notes
 1QR: First qualifying round

List of seasons

References

External links
 Official website
 FC Speranţa Nisporeni at weltfussballarchiv.com

 
Football clubs in Moldova
Association football clubs established in 1991
Nisporeni District
1991 establishments in Moldova
Football clubs in the Moldavian Soviet Socialist Republic